Pseudenargia is a genus of moths of the family Noctuidae.

Species
 Pseudenargia deleta (Osthelder, 1933)
 Pseudenargia regina (Staudinger, 1891)
 Pseudenargia troodosi Svendsen, Nilsson & Fibiger, 1999
 Pseudenargia ulicis (Staudinger, 1859)
 Pseudenargia versicolora (Saalmuller, 1891)
 Pseudenargia viettei (Berio, 1955)

References
Natural History Museum Lepidoptera genus database
Pseudenargia at funet

Hadeninae